The 1940 All-Big Ten Conference football team consists of American football players selected to the All-Big Ten Conference teams selected by the Associated Press (AP) and United Press (UP) for the 1940 Big Ten Conference football season.

All Big-Ten selections

Ends
 Ed Frutig, Michigan (AP-1, UP-1)
 Dave Rankin, Purdue (AP-1, UP-1)
 Charles Anderson, Ohio State (AP-2)
 Archie Harris, Indiana (AP-2)

Tackles
 Alf Bauman, Northwestern (AP-1, UP-1)
 Urban Odson, Minnestota (AP-1, UP-1)
 Mike Enich, Iowa (AP-2)
 Al Wistert, Michigan (AP-2)

Guards
 Ralph Fritz, Michigan (AP-1, UP-1)
 Joe Lokane, Northwestern (AP-1, UP-1)
 Richard P. Embick, Wisconsin (AP-2)
 Bill Kuusisto, Minnesota (AP-2)

Centers
 Paul Hiemenz, Northwestern (AP-1, UP-1)
 Claude White, Ohio State (AP-2)

Quarterbacks
 Forest Evashevski, Michigan (AP-1, UP-2)
 Don Scott, Ohio State (AP-2, UP-1)

Halfbacks
 Tom Harmon, Michigan (AP-1, UP-1) (1940 Heisman Trophy winner)
 George Franck, Minnesota (AP-1, UP-1)
 Bruce Smith, Minnesota (AP-2, UP-2)
 Ollie Hahnenstein, Northwestern (AP-2, UP-2)

Fullbacks
 George Paskvan, Wisconsin (AP-1, UP-1)
 Bob Westfall, Michigan (UP-2)
 William C. Green, Iowa (AP-2)

Key

AP = Associated Press, chosen by conference coaches
UP = United Press

Bold = Consensus first-team selection of both the AP and UP

See also
1940 College Football All-America Team

References

1940 Big Ten Conference football season
All-Big Ten Conference football teams